The Beneteau 361 is an American sailboat, that was designed by Berret-Racoupeau Yacht Design of La Rochelle, France and first built in 1999.

Production
The design was built by Beneteau in the United States, but it is now out of production. It was also called the Oceanis 361 and was marketed as the Moorings 362 with a two cabin configuration and as the Moorings 363 and Stardust 363 with three cabins, for use primarily in the yacht charter business.

Design

The Beneteau 361 is a recreational keelboat, built predominantly of fiberglass. It has a masthead sloop rig, a raked stem, a walk-through reverse transom an internally-mounted spade-type rudder controlled by a wheel and a fixed fin bulb keel. It displaces  and carries  of ballast.

It was sold in three cabin configurations, two cabin, three cabin and with a main saloon.

See also
List of sailing boat types

Similar sailboats
C&C 36-1
C&C 36R
C&C 110
Catalina 36
Columbia 36
Coronado 35
CS 36
Ericson 36
Frigate 36
Hunter 36
Hunter 36 Legend
Hunter 36 Vision
Hunter 36-2
Islander 36
Nonsuch 36
Portman 36
Watkins 36
Watkins 36C

References

External links

Keelboats
1990s sailboat type designs
Sailing yachts
Sailboat type designs by Berret-Racoupeau Yacht Design
Sailboat types built by Beneteau